Teretia anceps is an extinct species of sea snail, a marine gastropod mollusk in the family Raphitomidae.

Description
The length of the shell reaches 11.5 mm, its diameter 4 mm.

Distribution
Fossils of this marine species were found in Upper Pliocene strata in Alpes-Maritimes, France and in Italy; also in Middle Miocene strata in Poland.

References

 Cossmann (M.), 1896 - Essais de Paléoconchologie comparée (2ème livraison), p. 1-179
 Brunetti, M.; Vecchi, G. (2003). Sul ritrovamento di Teretia elengatissima (Foresti, 1868) in terreni pliocenici dell'Emilia e della Toscana. Bollettino della Società Paleontologica Italiana. 42: 49-57

External links
 Eichwald, E. (1830). Naturhistorische Skizze von Lithauen, Volhynien und Podolien in geognostisch-mineralogischer, botanischer und zoologischer Hinsicht. Wilna [Vilnius, Zawadzki. 256 p., 3 pl]
 Bellardi L. (1877), I molluschi dei terreni terziarii del Piemonte e della Liguria /

External links
 

anceps
Gastropods described in 1830